The 2015–16 Scandinavian Cup was a season of the Scandinavian Cup, a Continental Cup season in cross-country skiing for men and women. The season began on 11 December 2015 in Vuokatti, Finland and concluded with a stage event 11–13 March 2016 in Otepää, Estonia.

Calendar

Men

Women

Overall standings

Men's overall standings

Women's overall standings

Footnotes

References

External links
Overall Standings Men
Overall Standings Women

Scandinavian Cup
Scandinavian Cup seasons
2015 in cross-country skiing
2016 in cross-country skiing